Leland J. "Lee" Paschich (September 13, 1914 – October 5, 1993) and his wife, Helen, purchased the Chateau Montelena property from Yort Frank in 1968. In 1972 Paschich sold 90 percent of the property—retaining a 10-percent stake—to winemaker Jim Barrett and his partners, remaining on board as general manager.

References

1914 births
1993 deaths
American winemakers
People from Napa County, California
History of Napa County, California
Wine merchants
People from Sonoma, California